Chaudhry Jaffar Iqbal Gujjar (Punjabi), is a Pakistani politician who was a member of the Provincial Assembly of the Punjab from 1988 to 1993 and a member of the National Assembly of Pakistan from 1993 to 1999. He served as deputy speaker of the National Assembly from 1997 to 2001 and a member of the Senate of Pakistan from 2013 to 2015. He served in the Provincial cabinet of Punjab during his tenure as member of the Punjab Assembly, first as advisor to chief minister and then as Minister of Punjab for Health.

Family
He is married to Begum Ishrat Ashraf and has a daughter Zaib Jaffar and a son Chaudhry Muhammad Omar Jaffar.

Political career

He was elected to the  Provincial Assembly of Punjab as a candidate of Islami Jamhoori Ittehad (IJI) from Constituency PP-237 (Rahim Yar Khan-VI) in 1988 Pakistani general election. He received 37,849 votes and defeated Irfan Abdullah, a candidate of Pakistan Peoples Party (PPP). During his tenure as Member of the Punjab Assembly, he served in the Provincial Punjab cabinet as Advisor to Chief Minister of Punjab, Nawaz Sharif.

He was re-elected to the Provincial Assembly of the Punjab  as a candidate of IJI from Constituency PP-237 (Rahim Yar Khan-VI) in 1990 Pakistani general election. He received 48,651 votes and defeated Muhammad Aslam Khan Narro, a candidate of Pakistan Democratic Alliance (PDA). During his tenure as Member of the Punjab Assembly, he served in the Provincial Punjab cabinet as Provincial Minister of Punjab for Health.

He was elected to the National Assembly of Pakistan as a candidate of Pakistan Muslim League (N) (PML-N) from Constituency NA-149 (Rahim Yar Khan-III) in 1993 Pakistani general election. He received 79,720 votes and defeated Zafar Iqbal Warraich, a candidate of PPP.

He was re-elected to the National Assembly  as a candidate of PML-N from Constituency NA-149 (Rahim Yar Khan-III) in 1997 Pakistani general election. He received 76,201 votes and defeated Zafar Iqbal Warraich, a candidate of PPP. He served as deputy speaker of the National Assembly from February 1997 to August 2001.

He was elected to the Senate of Pakistan in January 2013 where he served until retirement in March 2015.

References

Living people
Year of birth missing (living people)
Punjabi people
People from Rahim Yar Khan District
Pakistan Muslim League (N) MNAs
Punjab MPAs 1988–1990
Punjab MPAs 1990–1993
Pakistani MNAs 1993–1996
Pakistani MNAs 1997–1999